Yi Hwa (1348–1408) or formally called as Grand Prince Uian, was a warrior and scholar during the Later Goryeo dynasty, also the royal family member in the Early Joseon dynasty. He was the only son Yi Jachun and Gim Goeumga, also the half younger brother of Yi Seonggye.

Life
He served as an assistant commander to his half older brother, Yi Seong-Gye (이성계), then after he founded the Joseon Dynasty in 1392, Yi Hwa was honoured as Count Uian (의안백, 義安伯) and after helped his half nephew, Yi Bang-Won (이방원) in defeated in the 1st rebellion, Uian become Jeongsagongsin (정사공신).

Later in 1400 during the 2nd rebellion, Yi went out again under the command from Bang-Won. Uian, along with Yi Suk-Beon (이숙번; formally called Prince Anseong, 안성군) and Yi Baek-Gang (이백강; formally called Prince Cheongpyeong, 청평군) were got the target and succeeded in defeated Yi Bang-Gan (이방간; formally called Grand Prince Hoean, 회안대군) and Yi Maeng-Jong (이맹종; formally called Prince Uiryeong, 의령군), then he was promoted to Jwamyeonggongsin (좌명공신, 佐命功臣) along with 47 others.

From all of his successions include in defeated Jeong Mong-ju with Bang-won, Yi Hwa then became the richest nobleman in the Early Joseon period and often got promoted until passed the 4 positions in military. Although he had title, such like: "Count Uian" and "Duke Uian", but after Bang-won (a.k.a. Taejong) reorganized the royal titles system and abolished the 5 Deungjak (오등작), Yi Hwa then was elevated to Grand Prince Uian (의안대군, 義安大君). According to the old tradition that an illegitimate child (especially son) couldn't had the same rank like the legitimate one, Yi Hwa became the one who was actually the illegitimate heir of Hwanjo whom his rank was elevated and same like Hwanjo's legitimate heir for seeing about his contributions in helped Seong-gye established the new dynasty.

Family
Wives and Children(s):
Grand Lady of Samhan State of the Sunheung An clan (삼한국대부인 순흥 안씨)
Yi Ji-sung, Prince Suncheon (이지숭 순천군, d. 1419) – 1st son.
Grand Lady of Samhan State of the Gyoha No clan (삼한국대부인 교하 노씨)
Yi Suk, Prince Wancheon (이숙 완천군, 1373–1406) – 2nd son.
Yi Jing, Prince Hakcheon (이징 학천군, 1375–1435) – 3rd son.
Yi Dam, Prince Yeongcheon (이담 영천군, b. 1379) – 4th son.
Yi Hyo, Prince Jeoncheon (이효 전천군, d. 1446) – 5th son.
Yi Hoe, Prince Heungcheon (이회 흥천군, b. 1381) – 6th son.
Yi Jeom, Prince Ikcheon (이점 익천군, d. 1433) – 7th son.
Lady Yi (부인 이씨) – 1st daughter.
Mae-Hwa (매화) – No issue.

Others

Ranks and Titles
Ranks:
In 1398, became Jeongsagongsin rank 1 (정사공신 1등).
In 1400, became Jwamyeonggongsin rank 3 (좌명공신 3등).
In 5 July 1407, became Chief State Councillors (영의정).
Titles
During his lifetime:
 Count Uian (의안백, 義安伯) in 1392.
 Duke Uian (의안공, 義安公).
 Prince Uian (의안군, 義安君).
After his death (along with Posthumous name):
 Grand Prince Uian (의안대군, 義安大君).
 Grand Prince of the Ui'an Mansion (의안부원대군, 義安府院大君).

Legacy
 Yi-Hwa Heritage Museum (이화 개국공신녹권, 李和 開國功臣錄券) – Become the National Treasure No. 232 on 15 October 1986; located in Jeongeup-si, South Korea. See here
 The Shrine of Grand Prince Uian (의안대군 사당) – Become the Namyangju National Treasure No. 4 on 10 April 1986; located in 151–4, Pyeongnae-dong, Namyangju-si, Gyeonggi-do, South Korea. See here

Descendants
Although his descendants had time to suffered a lot from their fate to just became a farmer until King Jeongjo of Joseon and King Sunjo of Joseon's reign, their lives be more better than before. It is said that in nowadays, almost of Yi Hwa's descendants live better now and have the nice home in Seoul City, South Korea.

In popular culture
Portrayed by Won Seok-yeon in the 1996–1998 KBS TV series Tears of the Dragon.
Portrayed by Lee Won-bal in the 2021–2022 KBS1 TV series Taejong Yi Bang-won.

References

External links
Yi Hwa on Encykorea .

Korean princes
1348 births
1408 deaths
14th-century Korean people
Jeonju Yi clan